Antics Technologies, Ltd. (often shortened to just Antics) is a software company based in Cambridge, England with offices both there and in Los Angeles, California, as well as in London. Antics currently develop their flagship product Antics3D, which is used for 3-dimensional animated event visualization. Co-founded in 2000 by Philip Swinstead as Kelseus Ltd., the company is privately owned and funded.

History 
Kelseus Ltd. changed their company name to Antics Technologies in 2004. The company has grown steadily since its inception, gaining employees and producing several versions of Antics3D, which is now approaching its 5th version. Despite several buyout attempts, the company has remained independent.

References

External links 
 Antics Official Website
 Philip Swinstead
 Developer offers free version of animation tool - Computeractive.

Software companies of the United Kingdom
Companies based in Cambridge
Software companies established in 2000
2000 establishments in England